Na Orlando Brown (born February 22, 1977) is a former American football wide receiver. He played for the Philadelphia Eagles in the National Football League (NFL) for three seasons. He was drafted by the Eagles in the fourth round of the 1999 NFL Draft.

College career
Brown attended the University of North Carolina in Chapel Hill, North Carolina. While at North Carolina, Brown accumulated 165 catches for 2,086 yards and 14 touchdowns. He also had a 48-yard touchdown run.

Professional career

Philadelphia Eagles
Brown was drafted in the fourth round of the 1999 NFL Draft, as the 130th pick overall by the Philadelphia Eagles. He played in parts of three seasons with the Eagles before he was released.

Orlando Predators
In October 2002, Brown signed with the Orlando Predators of the Arena Football League. After spending three months as part of the team in the offseason, he was released on January 23, 2003.   He was later signed onto the Giants.

Huntington Hammer
On September 16, 2011, it was announced that Brown had signed with the Huntington Hammer of the Ultimate Indoor Football League.

References

1977 births
Living people
People from Reidsville, North Carolina
African-American players of American football
American football wide receivers
Players of American football from North Carolina
North Carolina Tar Heels football players
Philadelphia Eagles players
Orlando Predators players
Huntington Hammer players
21st-century African-American sportspeople
20th-century African-American sportspeople